Alien Express (formerly known as Dead Rail) is a 2005 film directed by Turi Meyer and stars Lou Diamond Phillips, Amy Locane, Barry Corbin, and Todd Bridges. The film was released direct-to-video on August 13, 2005 when it was aired on Sci Fi Channel.

Plot
A new bullet train is speeding passengers to Las Vegas, along with a U.S. Senator from Texas running for president, when a meteorite crashes into a car near the tracks, releasing a tiny creature. The train stops to survey the damage, and the police are called. This stop allows the creature to board the train before it once again speeds off. Once it kills and consumes everyone aboard the train, it begins to grow and multiply into many differing creatures.

Cast
 Lou Diamond Phillips as Vic Holden
 Amy Locane as Rosie Holden
 Barry Corbin as Senator Frank Rawlings
 Todd Bridges as Peter
 Steven Brand as Paul Fitzpatrick

References

External links
 

2005 television films
2005 films
American science fiction horror films
2000s science fiction horror films
Films shot in Utah
Syfy original films
Films set on trains
American horror television films
American science fiction television films
2000s American films